Couzens is a surname and may refer to:

People
 Andy Couzens (born 1975), English retired footballer
 Brian Couzens (1933–2015), British music executive
 Christine Couzens (born 1958), Australian politician
 Dominic Couzens, British birdwatcher and writer
 Frank Couzens (1902–1950), American politician, mayor of Detroit, son of James
 H. D. Couzens (1872–1914), American writer
 H. H. Couzens (1877–1944), British electrical engineering executive
 James J. Couzens (1872–1936), United States Senator from the state of Michigan, father of Frank
 Julia Couzens (born 1947), American artist from California
 Kenneth Couzens (1925–2004), English civil servant
 Thomas Couzens (died 1959), member of the Royal New Zealand Air Force for whom Couzens Bay and Couzens Saddle are named
 Tim Couzens (1944–2016), South African literary and social historian
 Wayne Couzens (born 1972), British murderer and police officer

Places
 Couzens Bay, an ice-filled inlet within Ross Ice Shelf, Antarctica
 Couzens Saddle, a landform in Oates Land between the bay and Byrd Glacier

See also
 Cousins (disambiguation)